Dénes Pázmándy de Szomor et Somodor (10 March 1781 – 1 February 1854) was a Hungarian landowner and politician, who was a member of the National Defence Committee during the Hungarian Revolution of 1848. He served as Count (comes) of Fejér County in 1848. He surrendered before Field Marshal Windisch-Grätz in January 1849.

He was the father of Dénes Pázmándy, Jr.

References
 Hungarian Biographical Lexicon 
 Horváth, Mihály: Huszonöt év Magyarország történelméből 1823 – 1848. (I – III., Genf, 1865)
 Tóth, Lőrinc: A két Pázmándy (Hazánk, 1884. 1. sz.)
 Spira, György: A magyar forradalom 1848 – 49-ben. Budapest, 1959.

1781 births
1854 deaths
19th-century Hungarian politicians
Hungarian nobility
Denes I
Hungarian landowners
People from Komárom-Esztergom County
19th-century landowners